Pro Evolution Soccer 5 (abbreviated PES 5), known as World Soccer: Winning Eleven 9 in Japan and North America (sometimes mislabeled as World Soccer Winning Eleven 9 International), is a football sports simulation video game developed and produced by Konami as part of the Pro Evolution Soccer series.

Featuring Arsenal and Chelsea it is the first release of the series which offered fully licensed clubs from the Premier League, which is one of the 3 unlicensed leagues of the game. There are also 3 licensed leagues just like in the predecessor Pro Evolution Soccer 4. The game also includes 3 fully licensed leagues, which are the Spanish Liga Española, the Dutch Eredivisie and the Italian Serie A (with the exception of Cagliari).

As with previous versions, the game features an edit mode allowing the player to edit certain elements of the game. It was the last release to feature the German Bundesliga (in the game as German League) for Pro Evolution Soccer Installment before it was replaced by a generic league because of losing the license for the following releases.

Pro Evolution Soccer 5 marked the series' first appearance on the PSP. The game was also the first in the series to feature online play for the PlayStation 2. Within online play, statistics and league points are stored on the server for each game played. These points determine a team's (player's) position within the five online divisions. PES 5 was succeeded by Pro Evolution Soccer 6, which was released in 2006.

Reception

Sales
In Japan, Winning Eleven 9 sold  units for the PlayStation 2, making it one of Japan's top five best-selling games of 2005. It went on to sell 1,206,483 units for the PlayStation 2 in Japan. In France, it was the best-selling game of 2005.

In the United Kingdom, the PlayStation 2 version of Pro Evolution Soccer 5 received a "Double Platinum" sales award from the Entertainment and Leisure Software Publishers Association (ELSPA), indicating sales of at least 600,000 copies in the United Kingdom. It sold more than 800,000 copies in the United Kingdom, making it the UK's second best-selling game of 2005 (below rival FIFA 06). This adds up to more than  units sold in Japan and the United Kingdom.

Reviews
The U.S. PC and European PlayStation 2 versions received "universal acclaim" from critics, while the rest received "generally favorable" reviews on all platforms in both regions according to video game review aggregator Metacritic.

USA Today gave the PS2, Xbox and PC versions a score of nine-and-a-half stars out of ten and said it was "not only the ideal soccer simulation, but perhaps one of the top sports game out there. Accessibility and authentic play will attract both old and new fans alike."  However, it gave the PSP version a score of eight-and-a-half stars and said that it "loses a few key features, but retains the fun play and the sport’s overall spirit." The Sydney Morning Herald gave the game four-and-a-half stars out of five and said that the AI "is a harder nut to crack, requiring more thoughtful passing to open up your opponent before you strike. So long as you're thinking like a footballer, you're going to score goals." Maxim also gave it a score of nine out of ten and said that it "returns to the field to affirm its ball-kicking dominance. And thanks to its new online mode, your ears will be ringing 'goooal!' for days." However, Detroit Free Press gave the PSP version a score of two stars out of four and said that "with fewer buttons on the PSP than on a standard console game pad and only one analog stick to play with, the game's hallmark -- its deep, precise controls -- feels a bit muted."

References

External links

2005 video games
PlayStation 2 games
PlayStation Portable games
5
Video games developed in Japan
Windows games
Xbox games
La Liga licensed video games